Marianne Kriegl is an Austrian cross-country skier. She represented Austria at the 1984 Winter Paralympics held in Innsbruck, Austria and she won the gold medal in the women's 4x5 km relay B1-2 event, the only event she participated in.

References

External links 
 

Living people
Year of birth missing (living people)
Place of birth missing (living people)
Paralympic cross-country skiers of Austria
Cross-country skiers at the 1984 Winter Paralympics
Medalists at the 1984 Winter Paralympics
Paralympic gold medalists for Austria
Paralympic medalists in cross-country skiing
Austrian female cross-country skiers
20th-century Austrian women